The 2012 Wyoming Cowboys football team represented the University of Wyoming in the 2012 NCAA Division I FBS football season. The Cowboys were led by fourth year head coach Dave Christensen and played their home games at War Memorial Stadium. They were members of the Mountain West Conference. They finished the season 4–8, 3–5 in Mountain West play to finish in a tie for sixth place.

On October 13, 2012; Christensen confronted Air Force coach Troy Calhoun after the Cowboys' narrow 28–27 loss to the Falcons.  Believing Calhoun had told Air Force quarterback Connor Dietz to fake an injury in order to buy more time before the game-winning touchdown, Christensen launched a profanity-laced tirade at Calhoun, calling him a "fly boy."   Christensen apologized the next night and was reprimanded by the Mountain West Conference for his actions.  On October 22, Wyoming athletic director Tom Burman suspended Christensen for the Cowboys' game against Boise State and fined him $50,000.  Assistant head coach Pete Kaligis coached the team in that game.  However, Wyoming credits the entire season to Christensen.

Schedule

Box Scores

@ Texas

Toledo

Cal Poly

@ Idaho

@ Nevada

Air Force

@ Fresno State

Last meeting was in the 2009 New Mexico Bowl.

Boise State

Colorado State

@ New Mexico

@ UNLV

San Diego State

References

Wyoming
Wyoming Cowboys football seasons
Wyoming Cowboys football